Riccardo Calder (born 26 January 1996) is a former English professional footballer who plays as a defender/midfielder for non-league Brackley Town in the sixth tier. Calder is a product of the Aston Villa academy but did not break into their first team following loan spells at Dundee, Doncaster Rovers and Lincoln City. Calder represented England internationally at Under-17 level.  Known as a journeyman player, Calder is currently playing for his ninth team (excluding loan deals).

Early life 

Riccardo Amos Calder was born in Birmingham, England, on 26 January 1996.

Club career

Aston Villa

Calder joined Aston Villa at the age of nine in 2005. Calder was part of the Villa under-19's team which won the 2012–13 NextGen Series, beating Chelsea in the final of the competition. Calder never made a first team appearance.

Loan to Dundee

On 31 August 2015, the deadline day of the 2015 summer transfer window, Calder moved on loan to Dundee in the Scottish Premiership until January 2016. He made his debut for the club as a substitute in a 1–0 away win at Partick Thistle on 12 September 2015. Calder made his first start for Dundee against Ross County on 25 September, featuring on the left of midfield in a 3–3 draw. Calder started again against Motherwell on 3 October and assisted Rory Loy with a cross for the opening goal of the game in a 2–1 home win. Calder's loan spell ended at the beginning of January 2016, at which point he returned to Aston Villa.

Loans to Doncaster Rovers
On 3 March 2016 Calder moved to Doncaster Rovers on loan, making 12 appearances as Doncaster were relegated to League Two. On 12 July 2016, prior to the start of the 2016–17 season, Calder rejoined Doncaster on loan until January. He scored his first goal for Doncaster in an EFL Trophy tie against Mansfield Town on 30 August 2016. The loan was not extended and Calder returned to Villa.

Loan to Lincoln City
On 11 March 2017, Calder joined National League side Lincoln City on a one-month loan deal.

Inverness Caledonian Thistle
On 6 July 2017, Calder signed a two-year deal with recently relegated Scottish Championship club Inverness Caledonian Thistle.

On 8 November 2018, Calder had his contract terminated by the club after being found guilty of an assault in Birmingham in May 2018.

Later career
Since his conviction for assault, Calder has not managed to gain any long-term contract with any team.  Now a journey man he has average more than two clubs per season since 2019:

On 23 August 2019, Calder signed for National League North side Bradford (Park Avenue).

On 3 October 2019, Calder joined fellow National League North side AFC Telford United on a contract until the end of the 2019–20 season.

On 21 January 2020, Calder joined Nuneaton Borough on a dual-registration basis.

On 14 August 2020, Calder signed for Southern League Premier Division Central side Rushall Olympic.

Calder then returned to National League North in order to sign for Kettering Town.

On 19 February 2022, Calder rejoined former club Rushall Olympic.

In July 2022, Calder returned to the National League North to join Brackley Town.

International career
Calder has represented England at Under-17 level, playing at the 2012 Nordic Under-17 Football Championship in the Faroe Islands. He made four appearances including the final as England came runners-up to Sweden. Calder is also eligible for the Jamaica national football team through his family history.

Conviction and imprisonment
In a November 2018 trial at Birmingham Magistrates' Court, Calder was found guilty of assault on a 24-year-old woman, what began with a minor car accident resulted in a repeated assault on the victim by Calder. As a result, his contract with Inverness Caledonian Thistle was immediately terminated. This came less than a week after he scored his first professional league goal. Calder was subsequently sentenced to nine months in prison. Calder was released after serving 10 weeks of the sentence and stated his hope to return to professional football.

Personal life 
Calder records music under the pseudonym Cardz and made a rap music video for the YouTube channel, Link Up TV, called "Gettin' It", as well as an album called Overtime which is available on streaming platforms Spotify and Deezer. In 2018 he claimed to have turned down recording contracts to focus on his professional football at Inverness.

Career statistics

Honours

Aston Villa U19
NextGen Series: 2012–13

Inverness Caledonian Thistle 
 Scottish Challenge Cup: 2017–18

References

External links

England profile at The Football Association

1996 births
Living people
Footballers from Birmingham, West Midlands
English footballers
Black British sportspeople
Association football defenders
Aston Villa F.C. players
Dundee F.C. players
Scottish Professional Football League players
Doncaster Rovers F.C. players
Lincoln City F.C. players
Inverness Caledonian Thistle F.C. players
Bradford (Park Avenue) A.F.C. players
AFC Telford United players
Nuneaton Borough F.C. players
Rushall Olympic F.C. players
Kettering Town F.C. players
Brackley Town F.C. players
English Football League players
National League (English football) players
Southern Football League players
England youth international footballers
Criminals from the West Midlands (county)
English male criminals
English people convicted of assault
Prisoners and detainees of England and Wales